Nationality words link to articles with information on the nation's poetry or literature (for instance, Irish or France).

Events
 March 1 – Dylan Thomas posthumously honoured by a floor plaque in Poets' Corner, Westminster Abbey
 September – The New Criterion founded in New York City
 October – Canadian documentary film Poetry in Motion released
 Final edition of This magazine published in Canada

Works published in English
Listed by nation where the work was first published and again by the poet's native land, if different; substantially revised works listed separately:

Australia
 M. Duwell, editor, A Possible Contemporary Poetry (scholarship)
 Chris Mansell, Head, Heart & Stone (Fling Publishers)
 Les Murray:
 Equanimities
 The Vernacular Republic: Poems 1961-1981, Angus & Robertson; Edinburgh, Canongate; New York, Persea Books, 1982 and (enlarged and revised edition) Angus & Robertson, 1988
 A. Paolucci and L. Dobrez, editors, Review of National Literatures: Australia (scholarship)

Canada
 Margaret Atwood, The New Oxford Book of Canadian Verse in English (anthology)
 Margaret Avison, Winter Sun /The Dumbfounding: Poems 1940-66
 Dionne Brand, Primitive Offensive
 Don Domanski, War in an Empty House
 Robert Finch, Twelve for Christmas.
 Diane Keating, No Birds or Flowers
 Irving Layton, A Wild Peculiar Joy: Selected Poems, 1945-82 Toronto: McClelland and Stewart.
 Gwendolyn MacEwen:
 The Fire Eaters.
 The T. E. Lawrence Poems
 Earth-Light: Selected Poetry 1963-1982. Toronto: General Publishing. 
 Elizabeth Smart, Eleven Poems
 Michael Ondaatje, Running in the Family, memoir, New York: W. W. Norton, 
Wilfred Watson, Mass on Cowback.
 Phyllis Webb, The Vision Tree: Selected Poems

India, in English
 Keki Daruwalla, The Keeper of the Dead ( Poetry in English ), winner of the Central Sahitya Academy Award in 1984; Delhi: Oxford University Press
 Nissim Ezekiel, Latter-Day Psalms ( Poetry in English ),
 Arvind Krishna Mehrotra, Distance in Statute Miles ( Poetry in English ),
 Suniti Namjoshi, The Authentic Lie ( Poetry in English ), Fredericton, New Brunswick: Fiddlehead,

Ireland
 Dermot Bolger, No Waiting America
 Harry Clifton, Comparative Lives, Oldcastle: The Gallery Press, 
 Pearse Hutchinson, Selected Poems, including "Malaga" and "Gaeltacht", Oldcastle: The Gallery Press
 Paul Muldoon, Out of Siberia, Northern Ireland native published in the United Kingdom
 Seamus Heaney: Poems and a Memoir, Limited Editions Club, Northern Ireland native living at this time in the United States
 Derek Mahon:
 The Hunt by Night, including "Courtyards in Delft", "Rathlin" and "Tractatus", Oxford University Press, Irish poet published in the United Kingdom
 Translator, The Chimeras, Gallery Press, translation from the French of Les Chimères by Nerval
 John Montague, Selected Poems, including "A Drink of Milk", "Family Conference" and "The Cave of Night"

New Zealand
 Fleur Adcock (New Zealand poet who moved to England in 1963), editor, Oxford Book of Contemporary New Zealand Poetry, Auckland: Oxford University Press
 Allen Curnow, You Will Know When You Get There: Poems 1979–81
 W. Ihimaera and D. S. Long, Into the World of Light: An Anthology of Maori Writing
 Bill Manhire, Good Looks, New Zealand
 Cilla McQueen, Homing In, winner of the New Zealand Book Award for Poetry and the 1983 Jessie MacKay Award
 W. H. Oliver, Poor Richard: Poems, Wellington: Port Nicholson Press, New Zealand

United Kingdom
 Peter Ackroyd, The Great Fire of London
 James Berry, Lucy's Letters and Loving
 Sir John Betjeman, Uncollected Poems
 Roald Dahl, Roald Dahl's Revolting Rhymes
 Patric Dickinson, A Rift in Time
 Carol Ann Duffy, Fifth Last Song, Headland
 Douglas Dunn, Europa's Lover
 Gavin Ewart, More Little Ones (see All My Little Ones, 1978)
 U. A. Fanthorpe, Standing To
 James Fenton, The Memory of War: Poems 1968-1982, Salamander Press,
 Geoffrey Grigson:
 Collected Poems, 1963–1980
 The Cornish Dancer, and Other Poems
 Thom Gunn, The Passages of Joy
 Seamus Heaney: Poems and a Memoir, Limited Editions Club, Northern Ireland native living at this time in the United States
 Seamus Heaney and Ted Hughes, editors, The Rattle Bag, Faber, anthology
 John Heath-Stubbs, Naming the Beasts
 Alan Hollinghurst, Confidential Chats with Boy
 Ted Hughes, Selected Poems 1957–1981
 Kathleen Jamie, Black Spiders
 Roger McGough, Waving at Trains
 Derek Mahon, The Hunt By Night. Oxford University Press
 Paul Muldoon, Out of Siberia, Northern Ireland native published in the United Kingdom
 Nerval, The Chimeras, a version of Les Chimères, translated from French by Derek Mahon, Gallery Press
 Norman Nicholson, Selected Poems 1940–82
 Tom Rawling, Ghosts At My Back
 Jeremy Reed, A Man Afraid
 E. J. Scovell, The Space Between
 Muriel Spark, Going Up to Sotheby's and Other Poems

United States
 A. R. Ammons, Worldly Hopes
 Louise Simone Bennett, Selected Poems
 Hayden Carruth, The Sleeping Beauty
 Nicholas Christopher, On Tour with Rita
 Robert Creeley:
Echoes
The Collected Poems, 1945–1975
 James Dickey, Puella
 Hilda Doolittle ("H.D.", died 1961), Notes on Thought and Vision (written in 1919)
 Jack Gilbert, Monolithos
 Allen Ginsberg, Plutonian Ode: Poems 1977–1980
 Seamus Heaney: Poems and a Memoir, Limited Editions Club, Northern Ireland native living at this time in the United States
 Jane Hirshfield, Alaya
 Phyllis Janowitz, Visiting Rites
 Galway Kinnell, Selected Poems
 Denise Levertov, Candles in Babylon
 William Logan, Sad-faced Men
 James Merrill:
 The Changing Light at Sandover, an epic poem
 From the First Nine Poems
 W. S. Merwin, Finding the Islands, San Francisco: North Point Press
 Reynolds Price, Vital Provisions
 Peter Seaton, The Son Master (New York: Roof Books, The Segue Foundation)
 Gjertrud Schnackenberg, Portraits and Elegies
 Mona Van Duyn, Letters from a Father and Other Poems
 Theodore Weiss, Recoveries
 James Wright, This Journey

Criticism, scholarship and biography in the United States
 William Meredith, Reasons for Poetry, and The Reason for Criticism

Other in English
 Edward Brathwaite, Sun Poem, Caribbean poet living and publishing in the United States
 Mafika Gwala, No More Lullabies, South Africa
 Dennis Scott, Dreadwalk, Jamaica

Works published in other languages
Listed by nation where the work was first published and again by the poet's native land, if different; substantially revised works listed separately:

France
 Aimé Césaire, Moi, laminaire, Martinique author published in France; Paris: Editions du Seuil
 Odysseus Elytis, Marie de Brumes translated by Xavier Bordes into French from the original Greek
 Abdellatif Laabi, translator, Rires de l'arbre à palabre from the original Arabic of Abdallah Zrika into French; Paris: L'Harmattan

India
Listed in alphabetical order by first name:
 Faiz Ahmad Faiz, Sare Sukhan Hamare, Indian, Urdu-language
 Gitaujali Badruddin, Poems of Gitaujali (posthumously published)
 Jayant Kaikini, Kotitirtha, Sagar, Karnataka: Akshara Prakashana, Indian, Kannada-language poet, short-story writer, and screenwriter
 K. Satchidanandan, Malayalam-language:
 Janatayum Kavitayum, ("Poetry and the People"); criticism
 Venal Mazha, ("The Summer Rain")
 Rajendra Kishore Panda, Shailakalpa ("Mountainesque"), Cuttack: Grantha Mandir, Oraya-language
 Mehr Lal Soni Zia Fatehabadi, Soch ka Safar (The Journey of Thought) - published by R.K.Sehgal, Bazm-e-Seemab, J 5/21, Rajouri Garden, New Delhi in 1982. Urdu
 Saroop Dhruv, Mara Hathni Vat, Ahmedabad: Nakshatra Trust, Ahmedabad; Gujarati-language

Poland
 Ryszard Krynicki, Jeżeli w jakimś kraju ("If in Some Country). Underground publisher S.i.s.n.
 Ewa Lipska, Nie o śmierć tutaj chodzi, lecz o biały kordonek ("Death Is Not at Stake, But the White Cord"), selected poems, Kraków: Wydawnictwo literackie
 Czesław Miłosz, Hymn o Perle ("The Poem of the Pearl"); Paris: Instytut Literacki
 Tadeusz Różewicz, Pułapka ("The Trap"), Warszawa: Czytelnik
 Adam Zagajewski, List - Oda do wielosci ("Letter - An Ode to Quantity"), Kraków: Pólka Poetów, (republished in 1983, Paris: Instytut literacki)

Spain
 Matilde Camus:
 Testimonio ("Testimony")
 La preocupación de Miguel Ángel ("The concern of Miguel Angel")

Other
 Arturo Corcuera, Puente de los Suspiros, Peru
 Odysseus Elytis, Three Poems under a Flag of Convenience (Τρία ποιήματα με σημαία ευκαιρίας), Greece
 Ndoc Gjetja, E përditshme ("The Daily"), Albania
 Klaus Høeck, Eno Zebra, with Asger Schnack, Denmark
 Alexander Mezhirov, Проза в стихах ("Prose in Verse") (winner of the USSR State Prize, 1986), Russia, Soviet Union
 Nizar Qabbani, A Poem For Balqis, Syrian poet writing in Arabic
 Rajendra Shah, Prasang-Spatak, Indian, writing in Gujarati
 Søren Ulrik Thomsen, Ukendt under den samme måne ("Unknown Under the Same Moon"), Denmark
 Marie Uguay, Autoportraits, French-Canadian (posthumous)
 Silvia Volckmann, Zeit der Kirschen? Das Naturbild in der deutschen Gegenwartslyrik (scholarship), West Germany

Awards and honors

Australia
 Kenneth Slessor Prize for Poetry: Fay Zwicky, Kaddish and Other Poems

Canada
 Gerald Lampert Award: Abraham Boyarsky, Schielber and Edna Alford, A Sleep Full of Dreams
 1982 Governor General's Awards: Phyllis Webb, The Vision Tree: Selected Poems (English); Michel Savard, Forages (French)
 Pat Lowther Award: Rona Murray, Journey
 Prix Émile-Nelligan: Jocelyne Felx, Orpailleuse and Philippe Haeck - La Parole verte

United Kingdom
 Cholmondeley Award: Basil Bunting, Herbert Lomas, William Scammell
 Eric Gregory Award: Steve Ellis, Jeremy Reed, Alison Brackenbury, Neil Astley, Chris O'Neill, Joseph Bristow, John Gibbens, James Lasdun

United States
 Academy of American Poets Fellowship: John Ashbery and John Frederick Nims
 Agnes Lynch Starrett Poetry Prize: Lawrence Joseph, Shouting at No One
 National Book Award: William Bronk for Life Supports (April 27)
 Bernard F. Connors Prize for Poetry: Gerald Stern, "Father Guzman"
 Consultant in Poetry to the Library of Congress (later the post would be called "Poet Laureate Consultant in Poetry to the Library of Congress"): Anthony Hecht appointed this year.
 Pulitzer Prize for Poetry: Sylvia Plath: The Collected Poems
 Fellowship of the Academy of American Poets: John Frederick Nims and John Ashbery
 North Carolina Poet Laureate: Sam Ragan appointed.

Births
 January 14 – Luke Wright, English performance poet
 April 27 – Patricia Lockwood, American poet
 Paul-Henri Campbell, German American poet
 Roger Robinson, British dub poet
 Chris Tse, New Zealand poet, short story writer and editor

Deaths
Birth years link to the corresponding "[year] in poetry" article:
 January 19 – Marya Zaturenska, 80 (born 1902), American lyric poet, of heart failure
 March 11 – Horace Gregory, 83 (born 1898), American poet
 March 15 – Edgell Rickword, 83 (born 1898), English poet, critic, journalist and literary editor, a leading communist intellectual active in the 1930s
 March 18 – Yao Kitabatake 北畠 八穂, 78 (born 1903), Japanese, Shōwa period poet and children's fiction writer
 April 20 
 Archibald MacLeish, 89 (born 1892), American poet
 Aco Šopov, 59 (born 1923), Macedonian poet
 June 5 – Junzaburō Nishiwaki 西脇順三郎, 88 (born 1894), Japanese, Shōwa period poet and literary critic
 June 6 – Kenneth Rexroth, 76 (born 1905), American poet, of a heart ailment
 June 18 – Djuna Barnes, 90 (born 1892), American writer and poet
 July 20 – Okot p'Bitek, 51 (born 1931), Ugandan poet
 October 22 – Richard Hugo, 58 (born 1923), American poet, of leukemia
 November 13 – Babette Deutsch, 87 (born 1895), American poet
 December 3 – Bishnu Dey, 73 (born 1909), Bengali poet, prose writer and movie critic

See also

 Poetry
 List of years in poetry
 List of poetry awards

Notes

20th-century poetry
Poetry